Julian Knowle and Philipp Oswald were the defending champions, but Oswald chose not to compete this year.Knowle instead competed with Marcelo Demoliner. Demoliner and Knowle lost in the first round to Facundo Bagnis and Sergio Galdós.

Aliaksandr Bury and Igor Zelenay won the title, defeating Julio Peralta and Hans Podlipnik in the final, 6–4, 6–4.

Seeds

Draw

External Links
 Main Draw

UniCredit Czech Open - Doubles